Châtelaudren (Gallo: Le Chastèu) is a former commune in the Côtes-d'Armor department of Brittany in northwestern France. On 1 January 2019, it was merged into the new commune Châtelaudren-Plouagat.

Population
Inhabitants of Châtelaudren are called Châtelaudrinais in French.

See also
Communes of the Côtes-d'Armor department

References

External links

Former communes of Côtes-d'Armor
Populated places disestablished in 2019